William Clarke (May 1841 – 17 July 1907) was a Barbadian cricketer. He played in four first-class matches for the Barbados cricket team from 1864 to 1888.

See also
 List of Barbadian representative cricketers

References

External links
 

1841 births
1907 deaths
Barbadian cricketers
Barbados cricketers
Cricketers from Bridgetown